Katchewanooka Lake is one of the Kawartha lakes in south-central Ontario, Canada. The Trent Severn Waterway flows through Lake Katchewanooka into the Otonabee River at its outlet just north of Lakefield, continuing southwest through Little Lake in Peterborough and on into Rice Lake.
Lakefield College School lies on the east side of the lake.

Susanna Moodie, author of Roughing it in the Bush (1852), lived on a farm on the lake in the 1830s.

Although water levels in this lake and others in the Kawartha Lakes system are controlled to some extent by locks and dams, the lakeshore is vulnerable to flooding during the spring run-off period.

See also
List of lakes in Ontario

References

Lakes of Kawartha Lakes